Prickly skate may refer to the following fish species
Banded guitarfish (Zapteryx exasperata)
Pacific starry skate (Raja stellulata)
Prickly deepsea skate (Brochiraja asperula)